Edmond William Coady (7 April 1939 – 14 December 2015) was an Australian rules footballer who played with St Kilda in the Victorian Football League (VFL).

Notes

External links 
		

2015 deaths
1939 births
Australian rules footballers from Victoria (Australia)
St Kilda Football Club players